Alexander Beith McDonald (12 August 1847 - 31 October 1915) was a Scottish architect, who served as City Engineer and Surveyor in Glasgow Corporation's Office of Public Works between 1890 and 1914.

Early life
Born in Stirling in 1847, McDonald was articled at the age of 16 to the land surveyors and civil engineers Smith & Wharrie of Glasgow in 1862, and studied engineering, natural philosophy and mathematics at Glasgow University.

Career
At the age of 23, McDonald joined the Glasgow Corporation's Office of Public Works under City Architect, John Carrick in 1870, and soon became involved in development of a wide variety of municipal projects as part of the City Improvement Trust, such as police stations, fire stations, markets, baths, washhouses and tenements. He married Janet Napier at St Giles' Cathedral in Edinburgh in 1877, and had a son born in 1878. After Carrick's death, he was appointed City Engineer in 1890, then City Surveyor in 1891. McDonald retired from the Office of Works in 1914.

He was responsible for the layout of Bellahouston Park in 1896.

He was the architect for Govanhill Baths, which opened after his death in 1917.

Death
McDonald died on 31 October 1915 at his home in 29 Kersland Street, Glasgow of a cerebral haemorrhage resulting from a head injury sustained in a fall from a Sauchiehall Street tramcar. He was buried in the Western Necropolis. Nine months later his only son, Alexander McDonald Jr. was killed at the Battle of the Somme on 30 July 1916, aged 38.

Buildings

References

1847 births
1915 deaths
19th-century Scottish architects
People associated with Glasgow
Alumni of the University of Glasgow
People from Stirling
20th-century Scottish architects